Ablabera similata is a beetle discovered by Hermann Burmeister in 1855. No sub-species named in Catalogue of Life.

References

Melolonthinae
Beetles described in 1855
Taxa named by Hermann Burmeister